Trepobates taylori is a species of water strider in the family Gerridae. It is found from southern Texas, throughout Mexico and Central America, the Caribbean region, and South America, reaching as far south as northern Argentina.

References

Trepobatinae
Insects described in 1899